Spurs of Gold (Spanish:Espuelas de oro) is a 1948 Mexican western film directed by Agustín P. Delgado and starring Pedro Galindo, Crox Alvarado and Amanda del Llano.

The film's sets were designed by the art director Francisco Marco Chillet.

Cast
 Pedro Galindo as Armando  
 Crox Alvarado as Martín Vázquez  
 Amanda del Llano as Rosa María  
 Fernando Soto as Trompo  
 Consuelo Guerrero de Luna as Tía Isabel  
 Luis G. Barreiro as Don Niceforo  
 Pepe Nava as La cotorra  
 Carlos Múzquiz as Coyote  
 Julio Ahuet as Fidencio  
 José G. Cruz as Anselmo 
 Rogelio Fernández as Invitado a fiesta  
 Georgina González as Invitada a fiesta 
 Margarito Luna as Pueblerino  
 Rubén Márquez as Empleado banco  
 Ignacio Peón as Pueblerino  
 Humberto Rodríguez as Empleado banco

References

Bibliography

External links 
 

1948 films
1948 Western (genre) films
Mexican Western (genre) films
1940s Spanish-language films
Films directed by Agustín P. Delgado
Mexican black-and-white films
1940s Mexican films